The Graved Rock Site, also known as 20DK23, is an archaeological site located near Kingsford, Michigan.  The location is thought to be a ceremonial site associated with prehistoric Native Americans, and contains rock carvings.  It was listed on the National Register of Historic Places in 1995.

References

Dickinson County, Michigan
Archaeological sites on the National Register of Historic Places in Michigan
National Register of Historic Places in Dickinson County, Michigan